Wilhelm Schmid (1892–1971) was a Swiss painter, who focuses on New Objectivity and Magic Realism.

References

This article was initially translated from the German Wikipedia.

1892 births
1971 deaths
20th-century Swiss painters
Swiss male painters
20th-century Swiss male artists